Mehmet Aksoy (born 1939) is a Turkish sculptor. His sculptures often contain sensual figurative elements, but he is strongly rooted in a modernist sensibility with strong conceptual and abstract elements in his work. He works primarily in stone but also incorporates other material, fusing metal or differing stones in a single sculpture. He presently resides and works in a studio of his own dramatic design on the outskirts of Istanbul.

Early life
He was born 1939 in Hatay Province, Turkey. After completing his primary education in Yayladağı in Hatay Province, Tarsus, Mersin and Antalya, he enrolled 1960 in Istanbul Academy of Fine Arts (today Mimar Sinan Fine Arts University) to study painting. Later, Aksoy switched over to sculpture section, where he was educated by Prof. Şadi Çalık between 1961 and 1967. Following his military service, he served at the same academy as an assistant in 1969/1970. He went in 1970 to London after having received a state-granted scholarship for further studies. Aksoy moved to Germany to study at the Hochschule der Künste in Berlin, from where he obtained a master's degree in 1977. He returned in 1978 to Turkey and served until 1980 as an instructor at his alma mater.

Works

Statue of Humanity

Statue of Humanity was a statue under construction in Kars, Turkey created by Mehmet Aksoy.

Turkish Prime Minister Recep Tayyip Erdoğan described the monument as a "freak" during a visit to Kars in January 2011. In spite of protests, the city authority decided to remove the statue. In April 2011, works began to demolish it. Erdoğan insists that this was merely a question of aesthetics, yet according to The Economist the demolition could have been an attempt to appeal to nationalist sentiment ahead of the 2011 general election. As a response to Erdoğan's comments, Aksoy filed a lawsuit against Erdoğan for insulting him. In March 2015, a court fined Erdoğan 10,000 Turkish lira for calling the work a "freak". Erdoğan's lawyer claimed it was a critique rather than an insult.

Memorial to the Deserter

Memorial to the Deserter is a statue in Unity Square, Potsdam, Germany created by Mehmet Aksoy. The figure in this memorial, which honors those who refuse to fight in unjust wars, is carved in negative relief, a technique that Aksoy employed in later work.

References

External links
Mehmet AKSOY Biography
Image gallery of his works

Turkish male sculptors
People from Yayladağı
1939 births
Living people
Academy of Fine Arts in Istanbul alumni
Academic staff of Mimar Sinan Fine Arts University
Berlin University of the Arts alumni